Aston Park could be

Aston Park, Birmingham
Aston Park, Cheshire
Aston Park, Flintshire
Aston Park, Dallas